The BMW R 1100 R is a standard motorcycle with a  air/oil-cooled flat twin engine, made by BMW Motorrad from 1994 through to 1999. Like all of the brand's motorcycles of this period, all 53,685 units were made at BMW's Spandau, Berlin factory. The R 1100 R was succeeded by the model year 2001 R 1150 R.

The R 1100 R was reviewed favorably by Ulf Böhringer of the Süddeutsche Zeitung. Cycle World was impressed with the 1995 R 1100 R's comfort, versatility, overall quality, and successful combination of a venerable engine and frame layout with the latest technology, while noting the "fussiness" of the idiosyncratic control and accessory operations.

Performance
The R 1100 R chassis and engine are identical to the BMW R1100GS, while the front brake is from the R 1100 RS.

Antilock brakes were an option.

References

Further reading
 Jan Leek: Typenkompass BMW – Motorräder seit 1945. Motorbuchverlag, Stuttgart 2008, .

R1100R
Motorcycles powered by flat engines
Shaft drive motorcycles
Standard motorcycles